J. Davitt McAteer is an American lawyer, author, and activist from Fairmont, West Virginia. McAteer was appointed to the position of assistant secretary for the Mine Safety and Health Administration from 1993 to 2000 under President Bill Clinton. Throughout his career, McAteer has been an advocate for safe working conditions for miners, particularly in the coal industry. After the Upper Big Branch Mine disaster of 2010, where an explosion caused by negligence led to the death of 29 miners, McAteer Served on Governor Earl Ray Tomblin's independent investigation panel to determine the cause of the explosion. McAteer is the author of "Monongah: The Tragic Story of the 1907 Monongah Mine Disaster".

Career and research contributions

1966 - 1970 
While in law school McAteer conducted a study on the safety of West Virginia mines after the Farmington Mine disaster on November 1968. The findings of his study led to the first Mine Health and Safety Act in 1969. This Act led to the creation of MSHA and also provided compensation to miners completely disabled by black lung disease. The findings of the study were also published under the name "Coal Mine Health and Safety: The Case of West Virginia"

1972 - 1983 
In 1972  McAteer greatly improved the United Mine Workers Association's health and safety programs by improving the training of safety investigators. In 1976 McAteer joined the Center for Law and Social Policy in Washington, D.C. where he played a major role in developing two mining laws, an expanded mine health and safety law and also a federal strip mining control law. He was a part of the Center for Law and Social Policy until 1983.

1984 - 1993 
After leaving the Center for Law and Social Policy McAteer went on to create the Occupational Safety and Health Law Center. The Occupational and Health Law Center is a law firm located in Shepherdstown, West Virginia and deals with training and analysis of workplace health and safety issues.

1994 - 2000 
McAteer served as the head of the Occupational Safety and Health Law Center until 1993 when he was appointed as the assistant secretary for the Mine Health and Safety Administration (MSHA). During his term as the assistant secretary McAteer played a major role in the administration of the Federal Mine Safety and Health Act of 1977. When he was assistant secretary he mainly focused on changing MSHA regulations on coal dust to eliminate black lung disease. One of the ways he did this was revoking a system where exposure to coal mine dust was calculated using the average of multiple samples. He also was the Solicitor for the Department of Labor in 1996 and 1997.

2001 - present 
In 2001 McAteer joined the Benefits Review Board of the U.S Department of Labor. The Benefits Review Board makes decisions in appeals of the administrative law judges under the Black Lung Benefits Act and the Longshore and Harbor Workers Compensation Act. In 2005 McAteer was named the Vice President for Special Programs at Wheeling Jesuit University, the University he graduated from in 1966. Mcateer was responsible for overseeing programs that receive federal funding. During the time he was Vice President McAteer also led the investigation into the Upper Big Branch, Sago and Aracoma/Alma No. 1 mine disasters. The Upper Big Branch explosion was responsible for killing 29 coal mine workers and his report concludes it was caused by the neglect of safety regulations.

Legacy 
McAteer's publications include “Miner’s Manual: A Complete Guide to Health and Safety Protection on the Job”, which have sold more than 25,000 copies. McAteer has also directed and produced a video named “Monongah 1907”, and also wrote a book about the same mining disaster. He is known for leading the investigation of the Upper Big Branch Mine Disaster, which occurred in 2010.  McAteer has been a visiting lecturer at his alma mater West Virginia University School of Law.

Publications 
 Monongah the Tragic Story of the Worst Industrial Accident in US History. West Virginia University Press, 2007.
 Coal Mine Health and Safety; the Case of West Virginia. Praeger, 1973.
 Textile Health and Safety Manual: a Complete Guide to Health and Safety Protection on the Job. Occupational Safety and Health Law Center, 1986.
 How to Use Your Right to Know Chemical Hazards: a Guide to the New Hazard Communication Standards. Occupational Safety and Health Law Center, 1986.

References

West Virginia lawyers
Mine safety
Trade unionists from West Virginia
Lawyers from Fairmont, West Virginia
Living people
Year of birth missing (living people)
Activists from West Virginia

External Links
West Virginia & Regional History Center at West Virginia University, J. Davitt McAteer papers